This special championship was organized with geographical criteria with Serie B and the best Serie C teams from Northern Italy taking part. For this reason, it is not included in the statistics even if it was an official tournament.

Spezia asked to be admitted to Serie A. After the refusal of FIGC, Spezia decided to join the regional leagues.
Ultimately, Spezia was admitted to Serie B in the following season.

Teams
Northern Italy had 12 Serie B clubs: six regular and three re-admitted teams of the last pre-war season, and three clubs promoted from Serie C. However, newly-promoted Varese obtained a yearly break for huge wartime damages, while Spezia Calcio did not join.

All Serie C guests advancing to the final round were granted a titular Serie B licence.

Three groups were created: Western, Central and Eastern.

Group A

Final classification

Results

Group B

Final classification

Results

Group C

Final classification

Results

Final round

Final classification

Results

Footnotes

On 16 May 1946 the Lega Calcio was created. Under agreements between FIGC, Northern and Southern clubs, all clubs from this championship out of the last ones were admitted to the Northern Serie B.

References and sources
Almanacco Illustrato del Calcio - La Storia 1898-2004, Panini Edizioni, Modena, September 2005

1945-1946
2
Italy
Italy